Lound is a village in the South Kesteven district of Lincolnshire, England.

Originally part of the parish of Witham on the Hill, Lound became part of Toft with Lound parish between 1866 and 1931. Since 1931 Lound has been part of the civil parish of Toft with Lound and Manthorpe .

At the time of Domesday Book of 1086, Lound consisted of 18 households, two mills, and a church.

Earthworks of the deserted medieval village of Bowthorpe are near the 17th-century Bowthorpe Park Farm.

References

External links

Villages in Lincolnshire
South Kesteven District